Kevin Leonardo Mier Robles (born 18 May 2000) is a Colombian football player who plays as a goalkeeper for Atlético Nacional in the Categoría Primera A.

Professional career
Mier is a youth product of his local club Oro Negro from the age of 4 to 14. He converted from forward to goalkeeper in 2011. On 18 January 2016 he transferred to Atlético Nacional signing a contract and was initially assigned to their youth team. He began his senior career with two successive loans, with Santa Fe in 2019 and Valledupar in 2020. He returned to Atlético Nacional for the 2021 season where he started acting as the starting goalkeeper, and extended his professional contract with the club in June 2022 until 2025. He helped the club win the 2021 Copa Colombia, the 2022 Categoría Primera A season Apertura, and the 2023 Superliga Colombiana, earning him attention from abroad.

International career
At the age of 14, Mier was first called up to the Colombia U15s for the 2015 South American U-15 Championship, without making an appearance. He started for the Colombia U17s at the 2017 FIFA U-17 World Cup. He was also the starter for the Colombia U21s at in their winning campaign at the 2018 Central American and Caribbean Games, and was named best goalkeeper of the tournament.

Personal life
Whenever a game ends, Mier kisses his glove and looks to the sky in honour of one of his cousins who passed at the age of 17, and has the initials of his cousin tattooed on his hand. He is passionate about gastronomy, and has a bachelor's degree.

Honours
Atlético Nacional
Categoría Primera A: 2022 Apertura
Copa Colombia: 2021
Superliga Colombiana: 2023

Colombia U17
Bolivarian Games: 2017

Colombia U21
Central American and Caribbean Games: 2018

References

External links
 

2000 births
Living people
People from Santander Department
Colombian footballers
Colombia youth international footballers
Atlético Nacional footballers
Independiente Santa Fe footballers
Valledupar F.C. footballers
Categoría Primera A players
Categoría Primera B players
Association football goalkeepers